Ponkunnam Damodaran (1915-1994) was a poet, novelist, dramatist and communist supporter who was active from 1940 to 1970. He wrote the song "Pachappanamthate...", used in the Malayalam film Nottam. He was posthumously awarded the Kerala state award (best lyricist) for the song in 2006.  He was born in Ponkunnam in Kottayam district of Kerala. Damodaran wrote the novels Sarpam kotthunna sathyangal, Aadarsam theechoolayanu. He also wrote plays including Mathamethaayaalum Manushyan Nannavanam and Rashtra Silpi. He wrote six songs with Vayalar Ramavarma in Nammalonnu-drama written by Cherukaadu. The song 'Irunaazhi manninnai urukunna karshakar irukaali maadukalaayirunnu' Pachappanamthathe punnarappoomuthe punnellin poonkarale' were written for this play with music by M.S. Babu Raj and sung by kozhikkode Abdul kader.

List of songs used in films

References

Indian lyricists
Indian male poets
Malayalam-language songs
1915 births
1994 deaths
20th-century Indian poets
Poets from Kerala
People from Kobda District
20th-century Indian male writers